Acrobasis atrisquamella is a species of snout moth in the genus Acrobasis. It was described by Émile Louis Ragonot in 1887, and is known from Asia Minor, Israel and Iran.

References

Moths described in 1887
Acrobasis
Moths of Asia